Olav V Land is a peninsula in eastern Spitsbergen Island, Svalbard named after Olav V of Norway.

References

 http://www.ssb.no/aarbok/kart/i.html

Peninsulas of Spitsbergen